The 2002 Family Circle Cup was a women's tennis tournament and the 30th edition of the Family Circle Cup.  This WTA Tier I Event was held at the Family Circle Tennis Center in Charleston, South Carolina, United States. Unseeded Iva Majoli won the singles title.

Finals

Singles

 Iva Majoli defeated  Patty Schnyder 7–6(7–5), 6–4

Doubles

 Lisa Raymond /  Rennae Stubbs defeated  Alexandra Fusai /  Caroline Vis 6–4, 3–6, 7–6(7–4)

External links

Tournament draws

Family Circle Cup
Charleston Open
Family Circle Cup
Family Circle Cup
Family Circle Cup